Sir Charles Dennistoun Burney, 2nd Baronet  (28 December 1888 – 11 November 1968, in Bermuda) was an English aeronautical engineer, private inventor and Conservative Party politician.

Early military career
Burney, often called Dennis Burney, was the son of Admiral of the Fleet Sir Cecil Burney Bt. (Dennis Burney succeeded to the Baronetcy when his father died in 1929.) His sister was Sybil Katherine Neville-Rolfe. He was given a naval education, starting his training at HMS Britannia in 1903, and joining the battleship Exmouth as a midshipman in early 1905. He was posted to the destroyer HMS Crusader in 1909, which was being used for experimental anti-submarine work at the time.

In 1911, he came up with a novel seaplane design using a hydrofoil undercarriage.  Further development was carried out by the Bristol and Colonial Aeroplane Company and two prototype designs, the X.2 and X.3, were produced, but were unsuccessful.

On the outbreak of World War I, Burney was given command of the destroyer HMS Velox, but shortly afterwards joined the research establishment at HMS Vernon. There he developed the paravane, an anti-mine device, for which he took out a number of patents in 1916.  These were to earn him around £350,000 during the course of the war through their use by foreign merchant fleets.  He was appointed CMG in the 1917 Birthday Honours. In 1920 Burney retired from the navy with the rank of lieutenant-commander, and was promoted on the retired list to commander.

Vickers and parliament
Burney then became a consultant with Vickers and came up with a plan for civil airship development which was to be carried out by Vickers with support from the Government.  This evolved into the Imperial Airship Scheme which was to result in the R100 and R101 airships: Burney became managing director of the specially formed subsidiary of Vickers that built the R100 airship, where his design team, headed by Barnes Wallis, included Nevil Shute Norway, later to become known as a novelist.

In 1929, he published a book called The World, the Air and the Future.

His private interests led him to set up a company, Streamline Cars Ltd, to build technically advanced aerodynamic rear-engined cars from 1930–34: this was taken up by Crossley Motors.

Burney was Member of Parliament (MP) for Uxbridge from 1922 until he retired in 1929.

World War II
In 1939, Burney was again joined by Nevil Shute in the development of an early air-launched gliding torpedo, the Toraplane, and the Doravane glide bomb. Despite much work and many trials the Toraplane could not be launched with repeatable accuracy and was finally abandoned in 1942.
Among other military weapons, he was the inventor of the High Explosive Squash Head (HESH) shell and a British recoilless rifle, the "Burney gun". He demonstrated the advantages of the latter by constructing a recoilless shotgun with a  bore which he was able to shoot with no discomfort from the recoil. During World War II, he led development of a recoilless weapon for the British Army which entered service as Ordnance, RCL, 3.45 in, but too late to see service during the war.

Family 
In 1921, Burney married Gladys High, who was originally from Chicago. They had a son in 1923, Cecil Dennistoun Burney, who succeeded his father in the Burney baronetcy in 1968.

References

External links
 

1888 births
1968 deaths
20th-century British inventors
Vickers people
Conservative Party (UK) MPs for English constituencies
Baronets in the Baronetage of the United Kingdom
Companions of the Order of St Michael and St George
UK MPs 1922–1923
UK MPs 1923–1924
UK MPs 1924–1929